Clay City Township is one of twelve townships in Clay County, Illinois, USA.  As of the 2010 census, its population was 1,287 and it contained 649 housing units.

Geography

Cities, towns, villages
 Clay City (vast majority)

Unincorporated towns
 Camp Travis
 Maysville
(This list is based on USGS data and may include former settlements.)

Cemeteries
The township contains these three cemeteries: Barnes, Clay City and Travis.

Major highways
  US Route 50

Lakes
 Gaskin Lake

Demographics

School districts
 Clay City Community Unit District 10
 West Richland Community Unit School District 2

Political districts
 Illinois' 19th congressional district
 State House District 108
 State Senate District 54

References
 
 United States Census Bureau 2007 TIGER/Line Shapefiles
 United States National Atlas

External links
 City-Data.com
 Illinois State Archives

Townships in Clay County, Illinois
Townships in Illinois